Jorge Guardiola (born 1963) is a Spanish sport shooter and Olympic medalist. He received a bronze medal in skeet shooting at the 1988 Summer Olympics in Seoul.

References

1963 births
Living people
Spanish male sport shooters
Skeet shooters
Olympic shooters of Spain
Olympic bronze medalists for Spain
Shooters at the 1988 Summer Olympics
Shooters at the 1992 Summer Olympics
Olympic medalists in shooting
Medalists at the 1988 Summer Olympics
20th-century Spanish people